The 1971 TCU Horned Frogs football team represented Texas Christian University (TCU) in the 1971 NCAA University Division football season. The Horned Frogs finished the season 6–4–1 overall and 5–2 in the Southwest Conference. The team was coached by Jim Pittman, in his first and only year as head coach. Pittman died of a heart attack suffered on the sidelines of a game against Baylor in Waco, Texas on October 30, 1971. Assistant Coach Billy Tohill replaced Pittman as head coach for the remainder of the season, finishing with a 3–1 record.

This would be the Horned Frogs' last winning season until 1984. 

The Frogs played their home games in Amon G. Carter Stadium, which is located on campus in Fort Worth, Texas.

Schedule

Roster

References

TCU
TCU Horned Frogs football seasons
TCU Horned Frogs football